Malé Straciny is a village and municipality in the Veľký Krtíš District of the Banská Bystrica Region of southern Slovakia.

References
 Statistical Office of the Slovak republic

References

External links
 
 

Villages and municipalities in Veľký Krtíš District